The Little Elm River is a  river in western Houghton County on the Upper Peninsula of Michigan in the United States. It is a tributary of Lake Superior, flowing into it southwest of the Elm River.

See also
List of rivers of Michigan

References

Michigan  Streamflow Data from the USGS

Rivers of Michigan
Rivers of Houghton County, Michigan
Tributaries of Lake Superior